Maximum Demand Indicator (MDI) is an instrument for measuring the maximum amount of electrical energy required by a specific consumer during a given period of time. MDI instruments record the base load requirement of electrical energy. They can also measure the peak load, but are unable to record sudden short circuit or high motor starting currents.

The main parts of MDI are:
 Dial connected with moving system
 Pointer on dial
 Reset device
 Fraction device
 Indicating pin

MDI is often available as a built-in feature of three phase energy meters.

Maximum demand is calculated as: Maximum Demand(KW)=

References 

Energy measurement
Electric power distribution